The Little East Conference (LEC) is an NCAA Division III intercollegiate athletic conference.  The member institutions are located in all six states of New England.

History

Chronological timeline
 1986 - On April 28, 1986, the Little East Conference (LEC) was founded. Charter members included Eastern Connecticut State University, the University of Massachusetts Boston, Southeastern Massachusetts University (now the University of Massachusetts Darthmouth), Plymouth State College (now Plymouth State University), Rhode Island College and the University of Southern Maine; effective beginning the 1986–87 academic year.
 1993 - Western Connecticut State University joined the Little East, effective in the 1993–94 academic year.
 1997 - Keene State College joined the Little East, effective in the 1997–98 academic year.
 2000 - Bridgewater State University, Fitchburg State University, Framingham State University, Salem State University, Westfield State University and Worcester State University joined the Little East as associate members for field hockey in fall, while Salem State also joined the Little East as an associate member for men's lacrosse in spring, both effective in the 2000–01 academic year.
 2003 - Salem State added men's tennis into its Little East associate membership, effective in the 2004 spring season (2003-04 academic year).
 2004 - Bridgewater State added men's and women's tennis into its Little East associate membership, while Salem State added women's tennis into its Little East associate membership, both effective the 2005 spring season (2004-05 academic year).
 2009 - Worcester State added women's tennis into its Little East associate membership, while Bridgewater State and Westfield State added women's swimming & diving into their Little East associate memberships, all effective in the 2009–10 academic year.
 2015 - Bridgewater State left the Little East as an associate member for women's swimming & diving, effective after the 2014–15 academic year.
 2018 - Castleton University (later Vermont State University) joined the Little East, effective in the 2018–19 academic year.
 2019 - Western New England University joined the Little East as an associate member for women's swimming & diving, while Massachusetts Maritime Academy joined the Little East as an associate member for men's lacrosse, both effective in the 2019–20 academic year.
 2022 - The University of New England joined the Little East as an associate member for women's swimming & diving, effective in the 2022–23 academic year.

Member schools

Current members
The Little East currently has nine full members, all are public schools:

Notes

Associate members
The Little East currently has nine associate members, all but two are public schools:

Notes

Former associate members
The Little East had one former associate members, which was also a public school:

Membership timeline

Sports

References

External links
 

 
Sports organizations established in 1986
1986 establishments in the United States